Mang Kepweng Returns is a 2017 Filipino fantasy comedy horror film. The film is directed by Giuseppe Bede Sampedro and is under the production of Cineko Productions in association with Viva Films.

The film is a remake of the 1979 film Mang Kepweng where the titular protagonist, a funny albularyo, was portrayed by comedian Chiquito.

It was released in Philippine cinemas on January 4, 2017, exactly the same day of Vhong Navarro's birthday.

Synopsis 
The story revolves around Kiefer (Vhong Navarro), a normal guy who lives a quiet life until he goes through bizarre experiences, seeing ghosts and evil spirits. With this, his mother Milagros (Jacklyn Jose) is forced to tell him the truth that he is Mang Kepweng's son.

With Kiefer's determination to know more about his roots and how he is connected to the paranormal occurrences he is experiencing, he travels to the provinces meeting his half-brother Zach (James Blanco), a successful doctor who cannot cure his wife's Via (Sunshine Cruz) mysterious illness.

Zach later revealed that their late father Mang Kepweng (Chiquito) left a scarf which gives a healing power to whoever wears it. With Zach's desire to cure his wife, he tried it but it didn’t work which turns out that Kiefer is the chosen one who can heal using the magical scarf and this signals a new road for Kiefer, as the new Mang Kepweng this time.

Cast

Main Cast 
 Vhong Navarro as Kiefer Rivera/Mang Kepweng
 Kim Domingo as Allysa

Supporting Cast 
 Cristian Caingin as Estong Eskaryote
 Jacklyn Jose as Milagros Rivera Kiefer's mother
 James Blanco as Dr. Zacharias Rivera is Keifer's half-brother
 Sunshine Cruz as Via Rivera  Zach's wife and Kiefer's sister-in-law's  
 Juancho Trivino as Boy Pogi
 Balang as Mac is Keifer's adopted nephew 
 Chunsa Jung as Bea is Keifer's adopted niece
 Jobert Austria as Shogu is Keifer's best friend in manila
 Alex Calleja as Gabe is Keifer's best friend in manila
 Xia Vigor as Menggay is Nora's Daughter
 Josh de Guzman as Butchoy is Nora's son
 Jhong Hilario as Vladimir
 Pen Medina as Ingkong Kapiz
 Louise de los Reyes as Sofia
 Jackie Rice as Prinsesa Alissandra
 Valeen Montenegro as Rachelle
 Crazy Duo as Mickey & Bugs

Special Participation 
 Helga Krapf
 Luz Fernandez as Komadrona
 Petite
 Bangky Dido or Deadz
 Lotlot de Leon as Aling Dara
 Shalala
 Ahron Villena
 Tart Carlos
 Marlou Arizala
 Odette Khan
 Matet de Leon as Nora
 Ryan Bang
 Aling Carmen

Sequel 

A sequel was announced on August 20, 2019, on Twitter entitled Mang Kepweng: Ang Lihim ng Bandanang Itim and part of the 2020 Metro Manila Film Festival and to be released on December 25, 2020.

See also 
 List of ghost films
 Da Possessed
 Agent X44
 D' Anothers
 Mr. Suave

References 

2017 films
2017 horror films
Filipino-language films
Philippine ghost films
Philippine supernatural horror films
Viva Films films
Remakes of Philippine films
Philippine comedy horror films